Divine Service may refer to:

Divine Service (Lutheran), a term for the Eucharistic liturgy in Lutheran churches
Divine Service (Eastern Orthodoxy), the name of the Byzantine version of the canonical hours

See also
 Divine Office (disambiguation)
 Divine Worship (disambiguation)